Eisa Abdullah (Arabic:عيسى عبد الله) (born 16 June 1988) is an Emirati footballer. He currently plays for Al-Ittihad .

References

External links
 

Emirati footballers
1988 births
Living people
Al Wahda FC players
Emirates Club players
Al-Ittihad Kalba SC players
UAE Pro League players
Association football wingers